Elīna Ieva Vītola (born 14 May 2000) is a Latvian luger who represented Latvia at the 2022 Winter Olympics.

Career
She represented Latvia at the 2022 Winter Olympics in the singles event where she finished in 18th place.

References

External links
 
 
 
 

2000 births
Living people
Latvian female lugers
Lugers at the 2022 Winter Olympics
Olympic lugers of Latvia
People from Sigulda
21st-century Latvian women